Eugnosta hydrargyrana is a species of moth of the  family Tortricidae. It is found in Mongolia, China (Beijing, Heilongjiang, Shaanxi, Sahndong), Russia (Urals, Sarepta), Kazakhstan, Uzbekistan and Afghanistan (the western Pamir).

The wingspan is 27–29 mm. Adults are on wing from May to July.

Subspecies
Eugnosta hydrargyrana hydrargyrana
Eugnosta hydrargyrana mongolica Razowski, 1970 (Mongolia, China: Beijing, Heilongjiang, Shaanxi, Shandong)

References

Moths described in 1842
Eugnosta